Jakub Makovička (born 7 March 1981) is a Czech rower. He competed at the 2004 Summer Olympics in Athens with the men's coxless four where they came eighths.

References

1981 births
Living people 
Czech male rowers
Olympic rowers of the Czech Republic
Rowers at the 2004 Summer Olympics
Rowers at the 2008 Summer Olympics
Rowers from Prague
European Rowing Championships medalists